= Coastline Christian Schools =

Location
- 1801 North Loop Road; Alameda, California; United States

Information
- Type: Private
- Motto: "Transforming Lives for the Glory of God."
- Established: 1979
- Principal: Edward Yue
- Grades: K–8
- Enrollment: 410
- Colors: Maroon and gold
- Mascot: Rambo the Ram
- Accreditation: ACSI
- Yearbook: The Record
- Affiliation: Bay Area Chinese Bible Church (BACBC)
- Website: www.coastlinechristian.org

Coastline Christian Schools (CCS) is a private K-8 school in Alameda, California, United States. As CCS is a private school, all students are required to pay a nominal tuition fee.

== Academics ==
Average class size is about 22 students.

== Sports ==
Coastline Christian Schools also provides various sports teams at the middle school level.

Fall sports
Cross country (co-ed)
Boys' flag football

Winter sports
Boys' basketball
Girls' basketball

Spring sports
Boys' soccer
Girls' soccer
Boys' volleyball
Girls' volleyball

Students with a GPA lower than 2.0 or are failing in any academic class are not allowed to participate in sports activities.

Although CCS athletes do bring home occasional titles, the program is most noted for receiving a high number of Sportsmanship and Scholar Athlete awards. The Scholar Athlete Award rewarded the athletes for maintaining the highest GPA average during the season. In 2007, a student athlete was recognized in the local newspaper for her outstanding character in competitions.

In 2011, Bay Area Chinese Bible Church built a worship venue that includes a much awaited gymnasium that can also be used as an auditorium, dubbed the "Gymnatorium." Beginning in the 2011–2012 school year, the athletics programs will use this gymnasium as a home gym, for both games and practices. The volleyball, basketball, and badminton programs will be housed in this gym.

== Locations ==
- Alameda, California (K–8): 1801 North Loop Rd (37°43′41.87″N 122°14′25.63″W)
